Kato Souli Naval Transmission Facility is a facility used by the Greek Navy for transmitting messages to submarines
in the LF-range at Kato Souli near Marathon, Greece. It was commissioned in 1989 and uses as tallest antenna tower a 250-metre-tall guyed mast with umbrella antenna,
the tallest structure in Greece. The site has an area of 650 acres.
Nearby there was a transmission site of the US Navy with several shortwave transmitters.

External links 
 http://users.ntua.gr/chgantes/en/projects.shtml
 http://www.navy-radio.com/commsta/greece-t.htm

Naval units and formations of Greece
Marathon, Greece
Broadcast transmitters
Buildings and structures in East Attica